Social Justice Conference based on the theme "Build the Nation  on Justice" was held at the Ramlila Maidan in New Delhi on 26 and 27 November 2011. It was organized by Popular Front of India which is a Neo-social movement which strives for the empowerment of the weaker sections and marginalized communities with grass root level networking in many states of India. The Conference became a get together of like minded organizations and movements which strive for the common goals of justice, security and empowerment. The first day of the conference had two separate seminar sessions on the topics ‘Together for Empowerment’ and ‘People’s Right to Justice’. The second day witnessed a large flow of masses for the Grand Public Meeting

Declaration 

Social Justice Conference decision was taken at the two days meeting of the National Executive Council of the Popular Front of India in New Delhi.A nationwide conference campaign is designed to take out the conference message to every nook and corner of the country. An organizing committee has been constituted for the conduct of the conference with Muhammad Ali Jinnah as general convener, Muhammad Shafi and Muhammad Roshan as conveners.A PFI Press release said K. M. Shareef, General Secretary of Popular Front.PFI Chairman E.M. Abdul Rahiman, Moulana Usman Baig, Moulana Kalimullah Rashadi, Adv. K. P. Muhammad Shareef and others participated.

Inauguration 

The office of the Social Justice Conference was inaugurated at Vardhaman City Plaza 2, Asaf Ali Rd, Near Ramleela Maidan, New Delhi on October 16 by Moulana Nawabuddin Naqshbandi, Chairman Muslim Muthahida Mahaz. According to a press release issued by Mohammed Ali Jinnah, the Convenor of the Conference, the first copy of manifesto of the Social Justice Conference was issued by E. Aboobacker, the National President Social Democratic Party of India and the theme of the Social Justice Conference was delivered by Popular Front of India Chairman, E.M Abdul Rahiman.

The inauguration ceremony of Social Justice Conference campaign was conducted at the Nehru Maidan, Mangalore on Tuesday October 11. K M Shareef, National General Secretary, inaugurated the programme by way of waving the flag of Popular Front of India. Dr. C. S. Dwarakanath, the former chairman of the State Backward Classes Commission, Ilyas Mohammed Tumbe, PFI state president; Venkataswamy, the president of Samata Sainik Dal; and P. B. D’Sa, the district PUCL president; and many others were also present.

Publicity Programme of Social Justice Conference Held in Beltangady

A publicity program of the Social Justice Conference was held by Popular Front of India, here on Friday October 21.

Inaugurating the programme, AM Ataullah, zonal president of DK-Udupi said that the Dalith community which gave great leaders like Dr B R Ambedkar is banned from entering into the villages. Muslims, whose part was stupendous in the country's freedom struggle, are living in pathetic situation in the country even being worse than te Daliths. He said that few elements are trying to link Popular Front to terrorism even though it was working within the preview of law. The organization will never blow to any false propaganda and it has already reached 16 states of our country. He also invited people to Social Justice Conference, will be held on November 26–27 at Ramlila Maidan, New Delhi.
Speaking at the programme, Abdul Majeed Kodlipete, Karnataka state president of Social Democratic Party of India said, “Our constitution says that no one can be subjected to discrimination on the grounds of caste, creed, religion and place of birth. But what is happening in our country? Upper class people in our country including politicians, police, and intelligence agencies are depriving the rights of backward sections of the society”.

He further adds, saying, “In our country 1% of farmers are sharing 99% of land while 99% of farmers sharing only 1% of land. Is it social equality?” He said Article 39 of Indian constitutions says that resources of our country should be shared equally. But now CBI enquiry has proved that, in Karnataka, Reddy brothers have owned mining resource of Rs 15, 000 crores.

Speaking about the 2G spectrum scam, he said, “The scandal cost Rs 1.76 lac crores for the state treasury. Several people in our country do not have even a piece of land to build a house while governments are competing against each other to give lands of our country for Multinational companies and SEZ.”

Konkan Coast: Goa drums up support for Delhi conference
As part of its national initiative to hold public campaigns in different parts of the country, the Popular Front of India - Goa (PFIG) held a public meeting at Lohia Maidan, Margao, on Saturday, to promote their upcoming social justice conference to be held in New Delhi.

At the event attended by the public in large numbers, PFIG members explained that the theme of the conference to be held on November 26 and 27 is "build the nation on justice."

"Our constitution says that no one can be subjected to discrimination on the grounds of caste, creed, religion and birth place etc. It also says that no one should be deprived from law or justice because of his/her economical condition," explained Shaikh Abdul Rauf, general secretary, PFIG.

PFIG members further stressed that the conference would focus on the problems of every Indian community and that all governments are similar when they come to the matter of all other minorities. "The conference sessions and the nationwide conference aims to motivate the masses for playing a pro-active role in nation building on the constitutional foundations of justice, liberty, equality and fraternity," said Rauf.

Karnataka:People state-wide pour in for Popular Front's Struggle for Social Justice
Puttur, Nov 15: A mega publicity programme of Social Justice Conference was held at Puttur recently. Thousands of people including women and children poured into the town, where Popular Front of India was once denied permission from celebrating Independence Day. A rally and parade was also held as part of the programme. The cadres and supporters of the organization participated in the rally that started from Duggamma Deranna circle and ended at Kille Maidan, Puttur.

Speaking on the occasion K M Shareef, general secretary of Popular Front of India, said, "Creating awareness among the common masses about their fundamental rights, making them to join the struggle is primary object of Social Justice Conference".

"Social Justice is not only an agenda of Muslims or Popular Front of India. But our freedom fighters had intended to establish social justice in the country after getting freedom from British colonialists. Our country gained freedom before 63 years, but a section of the society is still deprived of it," he added.

He said, "Our constitution says every citizen of the country should get social, political and economical equality."

"According to studies, 42 crore people of our country are living below poverty line. Plight of poor people in eight northern state is worse than 24 nations of South Africa. We do not have a strong economical policy", he said.

Prominent columnist Shiv Sundar said that Brahminism and Colonialism are biggest enemies of our country and RSS is spreading brahminism in the disguise of Hinduism. All progressive groups of our country are fighting against these elements.

He called upon unity of all sections of the society to establish social justice in the country.

Elyas Thumbe, state president of Karnataka, presided over the program. Speaking on the occasion he called upon all Muslim groups to extend support for the organization for the empowerment of the community. He said it is working for the developments of minorities, Dalits and all backward sections.

Sayyad Ibrahim Thangal Athur, Father William Martis, priest of Udyavar church, Abdul Vahid sait, vice president of Popular Front of India, Karnataka, Dalit Nagaraj, president of Dalit Panthers of India, Nurul Ameen, state committee member, Popular Front, Kerala, Abdul Latheef, state vice president, SDPI, Karnataka, S B Darimi, Imam of Uppinangady Jumma Masjid, spoke on the occasion.

SDPI Karnataka state president Abdul Majeed Kodlipete, Usman Haji Mittur, president of Markazul Huda Women's College Kumbra,  Victor D'Silva Mangalore, Jalil Krishnapura, SDPI district president, Abdul Hameed Salmara, M. Kusappa, president of Dalith Sangarsha Samithi, Nuruddin Salmara, Popular Front national secretary Yasir Hasan and all state committee members and other members were present.

North-East India: Manipur Gets ready to attend SJC
Imphal, November 13, 2011: Ahead of a Social conference  at New Delhi on November 26 and 27, a state level seminar on the said issue was held at Manipur Press Club here today.

The State seminar organised by Manipur State unit Popular Front of India was attended by its president Mufti Arshad Hussain, NEC member of the Front Prof P Koya, former Manipur Human Rights Commission Member Ng Nongyai, Lilong Haoreibi College Lecturer, Hueiyen Lanpao daily editor M Shivdutta Luwang and Sharmila Kanba Lup convenor Janaki devi as the presidium members.

SJC flagged off at Ramlila Maidan

Day 1: ANDREW
Delhi's Ramlila Maidan, the same ground where Anna Hazare addressed his "anti-corruption" supporters, witnessed the inauguration of this Conference that focuses on the wider concept of Social Justice for all Indians. The Chairman of the Popular Front of India, Mr. E M Abdul Rahiman, flagged off the first day of the two-day conference. 
The showcase of the day was the Milli Convention christened "Together for Empowerment". In his Inaugural speech by the Fathehpuri Shahi Imam, Mufthi Muhammed Mukharram, underlined the fact of continued exploitation of Muslims in India, irrespective of political party.

Day 2:

Like the previous conferences, viz. the Empower India Conference in 2007 (Bangalore) and the National Political Conference of 2009 (Calicut), the SJC was populous. The difference however lies in the organization being able to prove its influence in the north by converging citizens from various corners of the nation and bringing the both political and religious leader on the same stage. This convergence, ascertained by many officials as one of the most disciplined, has set the stage for a broader consensus against the marginalization of minorities in general and the Muslim community is particular.

Several prominent personalities attended. The former MP and president of the All-India Muslim Majlis-e-Mushawarath, Syed Shahabuddin, rightly recognized that the state of Muslims could not progress without adequate representation in Parliament and Assemblies. He further stated that the government represents merely 15-20% of the population; and they seem least concerned about the general problems and hardships of the commoner. “Government of the elite, for the elite” was the exact words he has used during this speech to the many thousands who had attended there. All political parties have been tried and tested (and failed). He demanded reservation for Muslims in Parliament and Assemblies.

The Shahi Imam of Shahi Masjid Fathepuri, Mufti Mukarram Ahmed said” "When Justice Rajinder Sachar Committee and Justice Ranganath Mishra Commission reports have said that Muslims are even more deprived than the Scheduled Castes in the country and recommended reservation for them, there should be no reason for delay. The present regime is not willing to give Muslims their due. The need of the hour is to assert our right. We cannot afford to bear this injustice any longer.”
The Samjawadi Party head, Mulayam Singh Yadav, claimed that the intention of present regime was not good. Committees and reports have been formed, but they shy away from implementing them.“If Muslims are united & awakened, the government will be forced to accept their demands.”

The Ajmer Shareef Khadim, Syed Chisty underlined that the Muslims have preaching and practicing secularism for ages, lambasting the accusation of terrorism on the community as a whole. He asked the community leaders not to go into defensive mode during any “terror” incident. He also asked the Muslims not to simply blame the government for all woes; an introspection into the Muslim household should be done citing the high percentage of school drop outs. Education, he said, is the key – ensuring it is a need.

The Grand Public gathering that overflowed the Ramlila Maidan ended with the Delhi Declaration

The Delhi Declaration

The leaders who gathered in Delhi on the 27th spoke of the contemporary and pressing matters of the common Indian citizen, especially the minorities.

The people of India, have constituted India into a sovereign, socialist, secular, democratic republic to secure all its citizens, social, economic and political justice. This solemn declaration made in 1950 conveys the spirit, intention and vision of the nation. But after six decades of independence the ground realities leave much to be desired. Since independence the successive governments have failed to guarantee a life of dignity and security to the Dalits. The condition of tribals is worse. They were driven away from their dwelling places and multinational mining companies have grabbed their precious agricultural land.

The reports of Justice Rajinder Sachar Committee and Justice Ranganatha Mishra Commission have been discussed threadbare, ascertaining that the Muslims are now one of the most alienated communities in the country. Years have passed, yet the committee's report still remain mere academic exercises. 
Hundreds of innocent Muslim youth and their families have had their lives destroyed by the arbitrary arrests, illegal detentions and media trials.  Other minorities like the Christians and Sikhs also are the victims of prejudice and discrimination. The pillars of the republic are in the grip of casteism, communalism and nepotism to a large extent.

Two decades of liberalization that started in the 90's has warped the concept of social justice. The unequal distribution of public wealth, the relentless extraction of natural resources and the formation of special economic zones have only increased the misery of people.
The lion's share of the budget is swallowed by the armed forces without parliamentary scrutiny as many poverty alleviation and employment programs are stalled for lack of money.

There have been many instances of corruption and nepotism in the judiciary which tries to legislate rather than arbitrate. The judiciary which often protects the rights of the people have also fallen victim to the current uncontrolled pursuit of material pleasure.
The recent surge shown by Hindutva politics and the bonhomie between people of extreme right and the business tycoons have reignited the existential fear of the minorities.

Prominent points from the Declaration:

•Detailed overhaul of the current neo-liberal & pro-rich economic policies with a view to restore the concepts of welfare state where in the state is not merely a             passive observer.

•Building up of an inclusive people's movement for the eradication of corruption at all levels.

•Development of eco-friendly development programmes which will not contribute to global warming and environmental desolation.

•Implementation of Justice Ranganatha Mishra Commission report, to ensure proportionate representation in constitutional organs, bureaucracy public undertakings and education.

•Legislation for proportional representation instead of the existing first-past - the post system

•Reformulation of the foreign policy with avowed objective of establishing peace and cooperation on the subcontinent along with the revival of the Non- Aligned Movement

The delegates at the Conference also reiterated their commitment to  struggle to establish a New India of Equal Rights to all Indians. This was the same pledge made on the occasion of the launch of Popular Front of India in the Empower India Conference held at Bangalore in 2007.

References 

Political conferences
Social justice